Echinocactus parryi (also known as the horse crippler or devil's pincushion) is a cactus in the subfamily Cactoideae. It is endemic to the Mexican state of Chihuahua.  It has one synonym. E. parryi is thought to be quite similar to E. polycephalus but they differ in their branching habits, average number of ribs per stem, flower color and more. Echnocactus parryi is known to produce an average of 13 ribs per stem, pubescent spines and yellow flowers with a little red in the middle.

References

Plants described in 1856
parryi